Vaniyambadi is a town in the Tirupattur district of Tamil Nadu and the headquarter for the Vaniyambadi Revenue district comprising Vaniyambadi and Ambur. It is located about 200 km from Chennai and 178 kilometer from Bengaluru. The Vaniyambadi Municipality was formed by the G.O. MS. No. 421 Local & Municipality Dept. in April 1886. In 1996 this Municipality was upgraded to Grade II Municipality by G.O. MS. NO. 118 Rural Development Local Administration Dept. dated 01.05.1996. In 1998 this Municipality was upgraded to 1st Grade.

It is one of the hubs of Leather exports in Tamil Nadu. It is also famous throughout India for its special Vaniyambadi Biryani. The city is the home for many prestigious century-old educational institutions viz. The Vaniyambadi Muslim Educational Society (VMES) (Estd. 1901), The Hindu Higher Secondary School (Estd. 1914). The famous hill station Yelagiri is approximately 20  km away from town. Another hill station leading way through Andhra Pradesh is a short way to Kolar Gold Fields and Karnataka.

Etymology 
Vaniyambadi in Tamil Nadu derives its name and identity from mythological lore. Vaniyambadi is derived from Vaniampadi = Vani Ammai + Padi (Tamil: வாணி அம்மை + பாடி) which denotes "Vani Ammai" the name of the Goddess Saraswathi, and "Padi" refers the infinitive, "to sing".  Legend has it that Saraswati sang on the banks of the Palar River for God Vishnu and God Shiva here, and hence it was named Vaniyambadi. Indeed, temples dedicated to Sundara Varadaraja Perumal (Vishnu) and Athitheeswarar (Shiva) dot both banks of the fast-flowing Palar River. Vaniyambadi, today, is surrounded by lovely hills with many a scenic hill station positioned on them, green farmlands crisscrossed by numerous water channels and a sleepy little town amidst it all.

History
Vaniyambadi is a well-known place in the history of fights against the British. Hyder Ali and his son Tipu Sultan have been known to have camped in Vaniyambadi during their battles against the British empire, also Vaniyambadi battle is first for Tippu at the age of 17 when his Father was ill.

The Mysorean army set off on its fresh round of campaigning in the beginning of November 1767. According to De la Tour, it was two days after Haidar's mother had departed with her retinue. The main army marched towards Vaniyambadi while another detachment had been sent earlier in the direction of Tirupattur which had again fallen into British hands. The scouting parties of cavalry and infantry had reported an easy approach to Vaniyambadi along the course of the Palar river which flowed past the town and the route was covered with thick undergrowth and trees. Also there was no need of digging trenches for the artillery due to there being a ridge which could serve as a position for the cannons. The garrison there consisted of 30 Europeans with 1000 sepoys, mostly irregulars. The Mysorean army reached the outskirts of the fort at dusk on November 6 and set up a battery of 12 cannons on the ridge at night. The European commander of the artillery received a light wound in the process. Haidar ordered him to rest in his tent and took over the personal command of the battery. Throughout the night he sat under a tree nearby and directed the setting up of the artillery unmindful of the firing by the British who had now noticed his approach. Though this is not mentioned in other sources it is certainly characteristic of Haidar's courage and he would repeat it during the siege of Ambur. He left when the commander returned. The cannons commenced firing soon after dawn on November 7 and soon the British garrison in Vaniyambadi capitulated, probably due to its inadequate strength though no breach had been made.

Geography

Location 
Yelagiri and Javadi Hills are located to the south of the town. By road Vaniyambadi is surrounded by Ambur and Tirupathur which are 15 km, 24 km away respectively. It is on the banks of the Palar River.

Climate 
Vaniyambadi experiences a tropical savanna climate (Köppen climate classification Aw). The temperature ranges from 10 °C (50 °F) to 40 °C (104 °F). In the city, March to May are the hottest months and November to January are the coldest. Vaniyambadi receives 865.3 mm (34.07 in) of rainfall every year. The southwestern monsoon from June to September brings 360.5 mm of rainfall, with September being the rainiest month. The northeastern monsoon which lasts from October to December brings 294.7 mm of rainfall. The humidity ranges from 50% to 58% during summer and 61% to 80% during winter.

Demographics 
According to 2011 census, Vaniyambadi had a population of 195,061 with a sex-ratio of 1,023 females for every 1,000 males, much above the national average of 929. A total of 12,013 were under the age of six, constituting 6,121 males and 5,892 females. Scheduled Castes and Scheduled Tribes accounted for 15.15% and 0.09% of the population respectively. The average literacy of the town was 85.13%, compared to the national average of 72.99%. The town had a total of 40,559 households. There were a total of 61,013 workers, comprising 94 cultivators, 218 main agricultural labourers, 800 in house hold industries, 26,529 other workers, 3,372 marginal workers, 11 marginal cultivators, 100 marginal agricultural labourers, 202 marginal workers in household industries and 3,059 other marginal workers. It consists of 36 wards.

Islam is the majority religion in the town, while Hinduism is a close second. There is a small Christian minority.

Deccani Urdu is the main language of the town and is spoken by 55.6%, while Tamil is a significant minority of 38.8%. A small Telugu minority of 4.2% is also there due to the proximity of Andhra Pradesh. Leather tanning is a major industry of the town and leather garments, and making leather shoes are one of the economies of the town even today Vaniyambadi leathers have separate value in the global leather market. Agriculture, especially coconut plantations, is the other major source of livelihood.

Administration and Politics 
The Vaniyambadi Municipality was formed by the British Government in April 1886. In 1996 this Municipality was upgraded to Grade II Municipality by Rural Development Local Administration Dept. dated 01.05.1996. In 1998, this Municipality was upgraded to 1st Grade. 

The town consists of 36 Wards each with an elected Councillor. Legislative power is vested in the member council, headed by an elected chairperson and assisted by a deputy chairperson. The Municipal Commissioner governs the departments of the municipality. Law and order is maintained by the Tamil Nadu Police, headed by a Deputy superintendent.

Vaniyambadi is a part of the Vaniyambadi assembly constituency. The city elects its member to the Tamil Nadu Legislative Assembly once in every five years.  The city is part of the Vellore Lok Sabha constituency consisting of six assembly constituencies: Vellore, Vaniyambadi, Ambur, Gudiyatham, Anaicut and Kilvaithinankuppam (SC). 

Since 1952, the Vaniyambadi Assembly seat was held by the ADMK four times (1980, 2002 (by-election), 2011 and 2016), by the DMK four times (1962, 1989, 1996 and 2006), by the Indian National Congress three times (1957, 1984 and 1991) and by independent candidates four times (1952, 1971, 1977 and 2001). Present MLA is G. Sendhil Kumar from AIADMK.

Since 1952, the Vellore parliament seat was held by the Indian National Congress five times (1952, 1957, 1962, 1977 and 1991), by the DMK four times (1962, 1971, 1996 and 2019), by the Indian Union Muslim League four times (1980, 1989, 2004 and 2009), by the ADMK two times (1984 and 2016) and by the PMK two times (1998 and 1999). The current Member of Parliament from the constituency is D. M. Kathir Anand from the DMK.

Places of interest

Asia's second-largest telescope, Vainu Bappu Observatory of the Indian Institute of Astrophysics is situated at Kavalur near Vaniyambadi.

The Sundara Varadaraja Perumal and Athitheeswarar temples are the main draws of this town for pilgrims. The town also has a number of mosques built in the medieval as well as modern Islamic architectural styles. The dargah of Janab Masthan Ali Aulia Saheb draws devotees from all faiths, while the Avanghali temple nearby proclaims this town's great record in harmonious co-existence of different religions. Vaniyambadi is famous for its various local sweets and biryani.

Devotees to the temples here often extend their stay to visit one of the two hill stations that lie within half-hour drives from the town centre. Yelagiri, which is one such hilltop resort set amidst a quarter of mountains. The structure of tribal houses and the locals' small-scale industries, such as honey gathering and weaving, attract tourists to this hill station.

Economy
Vaniyambadi plays a major role in the field of leather industry. The main core business of this town is leather tanning and manufacturing of leather goods such as Garments, Gloves and Shoes. Over several decades, Vaniyambadi has contributed to millions of dollars for the Indian economy by exporting leather garments, leather articles and other chemical effluents all over the world. Vaniyambadi has shown better economy for past many decades. There are more than around 150+ tanneries and 2 effluent water treating plants.

Transport

Vaniyambadi is well connected by road and rail to major cities of India. The town is separated by a distance with Bangalore [144 km] , Chennai [199 km], Vellore [64 km] and Salem [139 km]. The town lies on the highway (NH 48) of the Bangalore-Chennai section which is part of the Golden Quadrilateral. A state highway connects the town to Tirupattur on the Vaniyambadi-Salem(SH-18), Vaniyambadi-Gudiyattam via Gadambur(SH-130) and Polur-Vaniyambadi via Jamunamarathur, Alangayam(SH-215). The town also has a railway station and is also close to Jolarpet Railway Junction, where most of the long haul trains stop. The nearest domestic Airport is Vellore Airport and nearest International Airport is Bangalore International Airport and Chennai International Airport major people's prefer Chennai airport for travelling. From the town, one can easily travel to the Andhra Pradesh, Karnataka and also to the southern parts of Tamil Nadu.

Higher Educational Institutions 
The city is the home for some of the prestigious century-old educational institutions. Due to their reputation, students from the surrounding towns of Ambur, Tirupattur, Jolarpet and Alangayam travel here to pursue their higher education. They are listed below:

Arts & Science Colleges 

 Islamiah Men's College (Autonomous)
 Islamiah Women's College (Autonomous)
 Marudhar Kesari Jain College for Women
 Imayam Arts and Science College, (Est. 2010) 
Wisdom Park International Educational Society

Engineering and Polytechnic Institutions 

 Priyadarshini Engineering College
 Priyadarshini Polytechnic College
 Vaani Polytechnic College, (Est. 2009)

References

Cities and towns in Tirupathur district